Puck was the first successful humor magazine in the United States of colorful cartoons, caricatures and political satire of the issues of the day. It was founded in 1876 as a German-language publication by Joseph Keppler, an Austrian-born cartoonist. Puck's first English-language edition was published in 1877, covering issues like New York City's Tammany Hall, presidential politics, and social issues of the late 19th century to the early 20th century.

"Puckish" means "childishly mischievous". This led Shakespeare's Puck character (from A Midsummer Night's Dream) to be recast as a charming near-naked boy and used as the title of the magazine. Puck was the first magazine to carry illustrated advertising and the first to successfully adopt full-color lithography printing for a weekly publication.

Puck was published from 1876 until 1918.

Publication history
After working with Leslie's Illustrated Weekly in New York – a well-established magazine at the time – Keppler created a satirical magazine called Puck,. The weekly magazine was founded by Keppler in St. Louis, Missouri. Keppler had begun publishing German-language periodicals in 1869, though they failed.  In 1871, he attempted another cartoon weekly, Puck, which lasted until August 1872.  Then in 1876, he again began publishing Puck in German. Interested backers wanted Puck in English so he published it in both languages for 15 years until he ceased the German version.

In 1877, after gaining wide support for an English version of Puck, Keppler published its first issue in English. The first English edition was 16 pages long and was sold for 16 cents.

Sometime before 1887, Puck moved its editorial offices from St. Louis to New York City.

In May 1893, Puck Press published A Selection of Cartoons from Puck by Joseph Keppler (1877–1892) featuring 56 cartoons chosen by Keppler as his best work. Also during 1893, Keppler temporarily moved to Chicago and published a smaller-format, 12-page version of Puck from the Chicago World's Fair grounds. Shortly thereafter, Joseph Keppler died, and Henry Cuyler Bunner, editor of Puck since 1877 continued the magazine until his own death in 1896. Harry Leon Wilson replaced Bunner and remained editor until he resigned in 1902. Joseph Keppler Jr. then became the editor.

The English-language magazine continued in operation for more than 40 years under several owners and editors, until it was bought by the William Randolph Hearst company in 1916 (ironically, one 1906 cartoon mocked Hearst's bid for Congress with his newspapers' cartoon characters). The Hearst conglomerate discontinued the political material and switched to fine art and social fads. Within 2 years, subscriptions fell off and Hearst stopped publication; the final edition was distributed on September 5, 1918.

London edition
A London edition of Puck was published between January 1889 and June 1890. Amongst contributors was the English cartoonist and political satirist Tom Merry.

Content 
The magazine consisted of 16 pages measuring 10 inches by 13.5 inches with front and back covers in color and a color double-page centerfold. The cover always quoted Puck saying, "What fools these mortals be!" The jaunty symbol of Puck is conceived as a putto in a top hat who admires himself in a hand-mirror. He appears not only on the magazine covers but over the entrance to the Puck Building in New York's Nolita neighborhood, where the magazine was published, as well.

Puck gained notoriety for its witty, humorous cartoons and was the first to publish weekly cartoons using chromolithography in place of wood engraving, offering three cartoons instead of one. In its early years of publication, Puck'''s cartoons were largely printed in black and white, though later editions featured colorful, eye-catching lithographic prints in vivid color. A typical 32-page issue contained a full-color political cartoon on the front cover and a color non-political cartoon or comic strip on the back cover. There was always a double-page color centerfold, usually on a political topic. There were numerous black-and-white cartoons used to illustrate humorous anecdotes. A page of editorials commented on the issues of the day, and the last few pages were devoted to advertisements.

Contributors
Over the years, Puck employed many early cartoonists of note, including, Louis Dalrymple, Bernhard Gillam, Friedrich Graetz, Livingston Hopkins, Frederick Burr Opper, Louis Glackens, Albert Levering, Frank Nankivell, J. S. Pughe, Rose O'Neill, Charles Taylor, James Albert Wales, and Eugene Zimmerman.

Puck BuildingPuck was housed from 1887 in the landmark Chicago-style, Romanesque Revival Puck Building at Lafayette and Houston streets, New York City. The steel-frame building was designed by architects Albert and Herman Wagner in 1885, as the world's largest lithographic pressworks under a single roof, with its own electricity-generating dynamo. It takes up a full block on Houston Street, bounded by Lafayette and Mulberry streets.

 Legacy 
Years after its conclusion, the "Puck" name and slogan were revived as part of the Comic Weekly Sunday comic section that ran on Hearst's newspaper chain beginning in September 1931 and continuing until the 1970s. It was then revived again by Hearst's Los Angeles Herald Examiner, which folded in 1989.

 Archives 
A collection of Puck cartoons dating from 1879 to 1903 is maintained by the Special Collections Research Center within the Gelman Library of The George Washington University. The Library of Congress also has an extensive collection of Puck Magazine prints online. The Florida Atlantic University Libraries Special Collections Department also maintains a collection of both English and German edition Puck cartoons dating from 1878 to 1916.

 Gallery of Puck cartoons

See also

 Punch magazine
 Osaka Puck Tokyo Puck''
 Yellow journalism

Notes

References

External links

 Puck at HathiTrust (black and white)
 Puck at archive.org (black and white, scanned from microfilms)
Gallery of 1877 Puck Magazine caricatures by Joseph Keppler
Cartoons from Puck featuring U.S. President Theodore Roosevelt
Guide to the Samuel Halperin Puck and Judge Cartoon Collection, 1879–1903, Special Collections Research Center, Estelle and Melvin Gelman Library, The George Washington University

1876 establishments in Missouri
1918 disestablishments in New York (state)
Defunct magazines published in the United States
Magazines established in 1876
Magazines disestablished in 1918
Magazines published in New York City
Magazines published in St. Louis
History of racism in the United States
Satirical magazines published in the United States
Weekly magazines published in the United States